Only Death is Real is the eighth studio album by American Hardcore Punk band Stray from the Path. The album was released on September 8, 2017, by Sumerian Records and distributed by UNFD in Australia and New Zealand.

Track listing

Personnel
 Andrew Dijorio – vocals
 Tom Williams – guitars
 Anthony Altamura – bass
 Craig Reynolds – drums

References

2017 albums
Stray from the Path albums
Sumerian Records albums
UNFD albums
Albums produced by Will Putney